Tadipatri or Tadpatri is a city in Anantapur district of the Indian state of Andhra Pradesh at the border of Kurnool district and Kadapa district. It is the mandal headquarters of Tadipatri mandal in Anantapur revenue division. The Chintala Venkataramana Temple is located on a five acre site in Tadipatri. The Bugga Ramalingeswara Temple is located one kilometer from the town, overlooking the Penna River.

Etymology 
Tadipatri was first a village called Tallapalle. It was developed into a town and renamed as Tadipatri by Pemmasani Ramalinga Nayudu I of the Pemmasani Nayaks, who made this town his seat of government and later developed as a major city in Anantapur district.

Geography 
Its average elevation is 223 metres or 731 feet. Tadipatri lies on the southern bank of Pennar River. Due to Mid Pennar Dam constructed upstream, the section of river in Tadipatri is usually dry throughout the year. Tadipatri is rich in cement grade limestone deposits. The limestone reserves are extending in a triangle from Tadipatri in Anantapur district to Kamalapuram in Kadapa district and Bethamcherla in Kurnool district.

The rocks in Tadipatri area are part of the Lower Cuddapah Supergroup. It consists of dolomite, limestone and shale.

Demographics 
 Census of India, Tadpatri had a population of 108,171.

Governance

Civic Administration 

Tadipatri municipality is the civic body of the town. It is a so-called first-grade municipality, constituted in 1920.

The municipality of the town oversees the civic needs like, water supply, sewage, garbage collection etc. It also implements strict ban on the use of plastic. In 2015, S.Shiva Ram Krishna was awarded Green Leaf Awards 2015 in the category of Best Municipal Commissioner, which was organised by Revanth Nagaruru.

Population 

As of the 2001 India census, Tadipatri had a population of 86,641. Males constitute 51% of the population and females 49%. Tadipatri has an average literacy rate of 56%, lower than the national average of 59.5%: male literacy is 67%, and female literacy is 44%. In Tadipatri, 13% of the population is under 6 years of age.

Economy 

Transport 

The Andhra Pradesh State Road Transport Corporation operates bus services from Tadipatri bus station. State Highway 30 passes through Tadipatri, which connects Anantapur and Bugga. Tadipatri railway station is classified as a C–category station in the Guntakal railway division of South Central Railway zone.

Culture 

Art and architecture

Some of the finest carvings of the early Vijayanagara period are from Tadipatri, a treasure-house of fine Vijayanagara sculpture.

Education
The primary and secondary school education is imparted by government, aided and private schools, under the School Education Department of the state. The medium of instruction followed by different schools are English, Telugu

Notable personalities 
 Moola Narayana Swamy – He founded Vauhini Studios, which was a large cine studio during the 1940s.

See also 
 List of cities in Andhra Pradesh

References 

Cities in Andhra Pradesh
Archaeological sites in Andhra Pradesh
Mandal headquarters in Anantapur district